The men's 100 kg competition at the 2020 European Judo Championships was held on 21 November at the O2 Arena.

Results

Finals

Repechage

Pool A

Pool B

Pool C

Pool D

References

External links
 

M100
European Judo Championships Men's Half Heavyweight